Jeremiah Matibiri (born 31 May 1971) is a Zimbabwean cricket umpire. He first umpired in first-class cricket in 2005, and in 2011 was involved in international cricket for the first time, umpiring a Twenty20 International between Zimbabwe and Pakistan.

See also
 List of One Day International cricket umpires
 List of Twenty20 International cricket umpires

References

1971 births
Living people
Zimbabwean cricket umpires
Zimbabwean One Day International cricket umpires
Zimbabwean Twenty20 International cricket umpires
Sportspeople from Harare